José Tadeo Monagas Burgos (28 October 1784 – 18 November 1868) was the president of Venezuela 1847–1851 and 1855–1858, and a hero of the Venezuelan War of Independence.

Career

Presidency

In 1846, to head off the challenge from the Liberal Party, ex-President and kingmaker José Antonio Páez selected Monagas as Conservative candidate. Páez thought Monagas could be controlled but he gravitated toward the Liberals, and eventually dispersed the Congress. In 1848 Páez led a rebellion against Monagas but was defeated by General Santiago Mariño in the 'Battle of the Araguatos', imprisoned, and eventually exiled.

As a member of the Liberal Party, he abolished capital punishment for political crimes. The Liberal Party also passed laws that abolished slavery, extended suffrage, and limited interest rates.  José Tadeo Monagas also supported his brother José Gregorio for the presidency.

José Tadeo Monagas and his brother José Gregorio Monagas combined rule 1847–1858 is commonly referred to as the Monagas Dynasty or "Monagato". During José Tadeo's second term, the Monagas brothers attempted to end term limits and extend presidential terms to six-years, which instead ended with the overthrow of José Tadeo at the hands of Julián Castro and his Liberal and Conservative allies.

Personal life
Monagas was married to Luisa Oriach Ladrón de Guevara, who served as First Lady of Venezuela from 1847 until 1851. She was then First Lady again from 1855 until 1858.

See also 
Presidents of Venezuela
José Gregorio Monagas
José Ruperto Monagas

References 
  José Tadeo Monagas – Official biography.
  José Tadeo Monagas

External links

  José Tadeo Monagas Biography

Presidents of Venezuela
Venezuelan soldiers
People from Maturín
1784 births
1868 deaths
Venezuelan people of Canarian descent
Venezuelan people of Spanish descent
Conservative Party (Venezuela) politicians
Great Liberal Party of Venezuela politicians
Burials at the National Pantheon of Venezuela
Monagas family